Nitre Hall is a 19th-century building in Haverford Township, Delaware County, Pennsylvania.  Built shortly after 1800 on the banks of Cobbs Creek, by Israel Whelen, Jr., the hall was the residence of the master of the Nitre Hall Powder Mills, which has long since been torn down.  With the ground floor reserved for custodians, the upper two floors are decorated in Empire and Victorian style.  The top floor contains various temporary exhibits and the educational Colonial Living Experience. It is near Lawrence Cabin, another historic building.

It was listed on the National Register of Historic Places in 1970.

Nitre Hall is open to the public May through October, in December for special events, and by appointment for a nominal admission charge, according to the Haverford Township Historical Society.

The building's main use is for school and group field trips. The historical society puts on a "day in the life" show for the township's fifth graders.

References

External links
 Haverford Township Historical Society: Nitre Hall

Houses on the National Register of Historic Places in Pennsylvania
Haverford Township, Pennsylvania
Museums in Delaware County, Pennsylvania
Historic house museums in Pennsylvania
Houses in Delaware County, Pennsylvania
National Register of Historic Places in Delaware County, Pennsylvania
Houses completed in 1805
1805 establishments in Pennsylvania